"Peace Sign/Index Down" is the first official single from Gym Class Heroes's studio album, The Quilt.  
The song features Busta Rhymes. Its title is a reference to the finger gesture.

Music video
The video premiered on MTV2 on July 19, 2008. It features cameos including Cool, Dre, Murs, and Tyga. It received 700,000 views a month after being uploaded onto YouTube.

2008 singles
Gym Class Heroes songs
Busta Rhymes songs
Song recordings produced by Cool & Dre
Songs written by Busta Rhymes
Songs written by Patrick Stump